Meall nan Tarmachan is a mountain in the Southern Highlands of Scotland near Killin just west of Ben Lawers. It is often climbed as part of the Tarmachan ridge, the other peaks of which are Meall Garbh (1026 m), Beinn nan Eachan (1000 m) and Creag na Caillich (914 m); these three peaks are Tops rather than Munros, and lie to the south-west of Meall nan Tarmachan.

It is normally approached from the east via the road heading north from the Ben Lawers visitors centre. From the Ben Lawers visitors centre the summit is only a short walk, with no real difficulties. Traversing the entire Tarmachan ridge does however involve some scrambling.

The name Meall nan Tarmachan is Gaelic for "mound of the ptarmigans".

References

Munros
Marilyns of Scotland
Mountains and hills of the Southern Highlands
Mountains and hills of Perth and Kinross
One-thousanders of Scotland